Polity is an academic publisher in the social sciences and humanities. It was established in 1984 and has offices in Cambridge (UK), Oxford (UK), New York (US) and Boston (US). It specializes in the areas of sociology, media, politics, and social theory. Polity is committed to publishing textbooks and course books for students and scholars. Its list features some leading thinkers (Jürgen Habermas, Zygmunt Bauman, Walter Benjamin, Ulrich Beck, Peter Sloterdijk and Anthony Giddens).

References

External links
 

Academic publishing companies
Book publishing companies of the United Kingdom
Publishing companies established in 1984